The 60th Oza was one of the main Go tournaments in 2012. The initial tournament began on 26 April 2012 and concluded on 13 September 2012 When Iyama Yuta went undefeated. Yuta went on to challenge then Oza title holder, Cho U, defeating him in three rounds between 25 October 2012 and 22 November 2012.

Challenger tournament

Finals

See also

 List of professional Go tournaments
 Go players
 List of Go organizations

References

External links
Nihonkiin.or.jp

2012 in go
Ōza (Go)